The Four Cardinal Principles and Eight Virtues are a set of Legalist (and later Confucian) foundational principles of morality. The Four Cardinal Principles are propriety,  righteousness,  integrity,  and  shame. The Eight Virtues are loyalty, filial piety, benevolence love, honesty justice, harmony, and peace.

Four Cardinal Principles

The Four Cardinal Principles are also referred to as the fundamental principles of conduct, or four social bonds. They are derived from the Legalist text Guanzi, attributed to the Qi philosopher Guan Zhong, although it is unlikely he was the actual author. The Four Cardinal Principles can be understood as:
 Lǐ (禮) - the rites, ritual; originally referring to the major Confucian duties, such as ancestor worship and issues of appropriate behaviour between generations. The concept was later expanded to all manner of ritualised cultural life. Within the Confucian tradition, the purpose of ritual was to engage in a continuous process of applying appropriate behaviours, taking the correct frame of mind when doing so, as a way to shape one's thinking and reinforce moral character.
 Yì (義) - righteousness; refers to both correct conduct, and the rejection of improper behaviour and dishonour. The concept is also heavily intertwined with Confucian ideas of filial piety and the correct social order. 
 Lián (廉) - integrity; refers to always being 'upright' in one's behaviour.
 Chǐ (恥) - shame; refers to the appropriate response one should feel towards inappropriate behaviour; it is considered one of the means by which individuals judge right from wrong. Within the Legalist Confucian tradition, "shame" was considered the more effective means of controlling the behaviour of the population, as opposed to punishment, as it allowed individuals to recognise their transgression and engage in self-improvement.
In some renderings of the principles, the concept of chi is replaced with honour.

In a speech in 1934, Generalissimo Chiang Kai-shek invoked the importance of the four principles as a guide for the New Life Movement.  The movement was an attempt to reintroduce Confucian principles into everyday life in China as a means to create national unity and act as a bulwark against communism.

The four pockets on a Sun Yat-sen-style suit jacket are said to represent these four principles.

Eight Virtues
 
The Eight Virtues were taken from a speech made by Dr Sun Yat-sen as he was outlining his Three Principles of the People.

The influence of the Eight Virtues is particularly obvious in Taiwan where many major streets in larger cities are named for them. The Eight Virtues are taken from a speech by the Chinese Nationalist statesman Sun Yat-sen.

See also
 Politics of the Republic of China
 Three Principles of the People

References

Legalism (Chinese philosophy)
Confucian ethics
Ideology of the Kuomintang
Political theories
Politics of the Republic of China
Social philosophy
State ideologies